Global Banking and Finance Review is a finance magazine based in the United Kingdom. It was launched in 2010 by Varun Sash. The magazine focuses on global financial trends and developments. Wanda Rich is the current editor of Global Banking and Finance Review. Their awards program, Global Banking & Finance Awards, was launched in 2011.

History 
Global Banking and Finance Review was established in 2010 to create an independent and trustworthy finance content platform to influence the global financial community. The magazine publishes content on banking, brokerage, foreign exchange, Islamic finance, corporate governance, wealth management, taxes, accounting, mergers and acquisitions, inward investment and various CSR activities. The magazine content is in the form of interviews, news, analysis, op-eds, reviews and videos.

Global Banking And Finance Awards 
The Global Banking & Finance Awards was started in 2011 to recognize and honor inspirational changes happening in the global financing community. They reflect the innovation, achievement, strategy, progressive and inspirational changes taking place within the financial sector.

DBS Bank, International Bank of Qatar, BMO Capital Markets, Noor Bank, Scotiabank, Zenith Bank, Alawwal Bank, Stanbic IBTC Holdings, ICS Financial Systems,  NDB Bank, Kanrich Finance, Bursa Malaysia, Bank of Montreal, Credit Andorra, and Standard Chartered Bank are some of the winners of the Global Banking & Finance Awards. Both the Magazine and the Award is a registered trademark of GBAF Publications Ltd, UK.

References 

Magazine publishing